The Burarra language is an Australian Aboriginal language spoken by the Burarra people of Arnhem Land. It has several dialects.

Other names and spellings include Barera, Bawera, Burada, Bureda, Burera, An-barra (Anbarra), Gidjingaliya, Gu-jingarliya, Gu-jarlabiya, Gun-Guragone (also used for Guragone), Jikai, Tchikai.

The Djangu people have a Burarra clan, which is sometimes confused with this language.

Classification
Burarra is a prefixing non-Pama-Nyungan language. Along with Gurr-goni, it makes up the Burarran branch of the Maningrida language family (which also includes Ndjébbana and Na-kara).

Distribution
The Burarra people are from the Blyth and Cadell River regions of Central and North-central Arnhem Land, but many now reside further west in Maningrida township at the mouth of the Liverpool River.

Dialects
These dialect names derive from each dialect's word for the demonstrative "that". She further notes that the two latter dialects ( and ) are frequently grouped together and referred to by their eastern neighbours as "", and by themselves as "" ('language'/'with tongue').

Phonology

Consonants 

In most cases, fortis and lenis refers to the voicing in consonants where fortis is voiceless and lenis is voiced. In this case, plosives are distinguished by intra-oral peak pressure and stricture duration. Fortis consonants are usually longer in duration and have a greater intra-oral pressure while lenis consonants can often be pronounced as fricatives or approximants. The Burarra language also allows for the clustering of consonants.

Vowels 
Burara has a five vowel system.

The vowels can be realized as:

 /i/: close-mid front vowel, [e], or [ɪ]
 /a/: low central vowel or schwa
 /æ/: [æ], [ɛ] or [e]
 /ɔ/: [ɔ] or [o]
 /u/: schwa, a lowered open-mid back rounded vowel, a lowered [ö], or [ʊ]

Grammar
Burarra is a prefixing, multiple-classifying language. Verbs co-reference their subjects and objects through the use of prefixes, and inflect for tense and status. Serial verbs can be used to express categories like aspect, compound action and causation.

Nouns inflect for case and belong to one of four noun classes (an-, jin-, mun- and gun-).

Further reading
 Capell, A. 1942. Languages of Arnhem Land, North Australia. Oceania, 12 (4), 364–392.
 Elwell, Vanessa. 1977. Multilingualism and lingua francas among Australian Aborigines: A case study of Maningrida. Honours Thesis, Australian National University.
 Elwell, Vanessa. 1982. Some social factors affecting multilingualism among Aboriginal Australians: a case study of Maningrida. International Journal of the Sociology of Language 36: 83–103.
 Glasgow, Kathleen. 1981. Burarra phonemes. In Work papers of SIL-AAB, series A (Vol. 5). Darwin: Summer Institute of Linguistics.
 Glasgow, Kathleen. 1994. Burarra–Gun-nartpa dictionary with English finder list. Darwin: Summer Institute of Linguistics.
 Green, Rebecca. 1987. A sketch grammar of Burarra. Honours Thesis, Australian National University Canberra.
 Green, R. 2003. Proto Maningrida within Proto Arnhem: evidence from verbal inflectional suffixes. In N. Evans (Ed.), The non-Pama-Nyungan languages of Northern Australia: comparative studies of the continent's most linguistically complex region (pp. 369–421). Canberra: Pacific Linguistics.
 Handelsmann, Robert. 1996. Needs Survey of Community Languages: Central Arnhem Land, Northern Territory (Maningrida and Outstations). Report to the Aboriginal and Torres Strait Islander Commission, Canberra.
 Trefry, D. (1983). Discerning the back vowels /u/ and /o/ in Burarra, a language of the Australian Northern Territory. Working papers of the Speech and Language Research Centre, 3 (6), pp. 19–51.

References

External links 
 ELAR archive of Gun-nartpa

Maningrida languages